Joyce Chopra (born October 27, 1936) is an American director.

She was married to American stage and screenwriter Tom Cole until his death on February 23, 2009.

Life and career

Chopra was one of three siblings born in New York City to Abraham, a lawyer and judge, and Tillie ( Ornstein) Kalina, and raised in the Coney Island and Brighton Beach neighborhoods.

Chopra graduated from Brandeis University in Waltham, Massachusetts. A few months after her graduation, she and a partner opened a European-style coffee house near Harvard Square at 47 Mt. Auburn Street, quickly turning it into a music club (Club 47) where everyone from Joan Baez to Bob Dylan performed. The club was the subject of the 2012 film For the Love of the Music, shown at the Boston International Film Festival.

Her own film career began with documentary filmmaking in 1963 and gained much recognition by feminist film scholars with her autobiographical documentary Joyce at 34 (released 1974). The film stars Chopra and examines the effect her pregnancy had on her filmmaking career. The documentary received the American Film Festival Blue Ribbon award. The film explores the issues surrounding women when pursuing the creation of a family while also creating a professional career.

Her next documentary project was a trilogy of short films. Matina Horner: Portrait of a Person (1973) focused on the titular professor and president of Radcliffe College, Girls at 12 (1975) examined the transition of young girls into teenagers, and Clorae and Albie (1976) examines the lives of two young black women in Boston who have been best friends since childhood but are starting to drift apart on different paths.

Chopra transitioned into fiction film making around the mid-1980s after meeting and working with Tom Cole. One of their first collaborations was a PBS American Playhouse production Medal of Honor Rag in 1982.

Her first narrative feature-length film, Smooth Talk (1985), was nominated for the Independent Spirit Award for Best Director and won the Grand Jury Prize at the 1985 Sundance Film Festival. The film is an adaptation of Joyce Carol Oates' 1966 short story, "Where Are You Going, Where Have You Been?", and was adapted by Tom Cole.

Her second feature-length film, The Lemon Sisters, was made in conjunction with producer and star Diane Keaton. The film explores the long-term female friendships between Eloise (Keaton), Franki (Carol Kane) and Nola (Kathryn Grody). After The Lemon Sisters, Chopra turned to directing television, ranging from television dramas to made-for-TV movies.

In addition to directing her own films, Chopra is part of BYKids, a nonprofit pairing filmmakers with youth from around the world to create short documentaries. My Beautiful Nicaragua, a 24-minute documentary about the devastating effects of climate change on coffee production in Nicaragua.

Awards
 Smooth Talk: Grand Jury Prize at Sundance for Best Dramatic Feature (1985)
 Molly: An American Girl on the Homefront: Humanities Award
That Our Children Will Not Die: American Film Festival Blue Ribbon Award
 Joyce at 34: American Film Festival Blue Ribbon Award
 Martha Clarke Light & Dark: A Dancer's Journal: American Film Festival Blue Ribbon Award
 Girls at Twelve: American Film Festival Blue Ribbon Award

Nominations
 Smooth Talk - Independent Spirit Award for Best Director (1985), Independent Spirit Award for Best Picture (1985)
 Molly: An American Girl on the Home Front - DGA nomination for Best Director

Themes
Much of Chopra's work treats the themes of sexuality and sensuality of women. These films often focus on the transitional periods in women's lives. Girls at 12 and Smooth Talk are concerned with puberty; Joyce at 34 focuses on pregnancy; and The Lemon Sisters centers around new loves, lifestyles, and new career choices. Her other works — mostly documentaries — focus on youth.

Filmography 
Fiction:
 Smooth Talk (1985)
 The Lemon Sisters (1990)

Documentary:
 A Happy Mother's Day (1963) co-directed with Richard Leacock
 Joyce at 34 (1974)
 Girls at 12 (1975)
 Clorae & Albie (1976)
 That Our Children Will Not Die (1978)
 Martha Clarke, Light and Dark (1981)
 Gramercy stories (2008)
 Fire in Our Hearts (2012)

Made-for-TV movies:
 Murder in New Hampshire: The Pamela Wojas Smart Story (1991)
 Baby Snatcher (1992)
 The Danger of Love: The Carolyn Warmus Story (1992)
 The Disappearance of Nora (1993)
 Angel Falls (1993) TV Series
 The Corpse Had a Familiar Face (1994)
 Deadline for Murder: From the Files of Edna Buchanan (1995)
 My Very Best Friend (1996)
 L.A. Johns (1997)
 Convictions (1997)
 Murder in a Small Town (1999)
 Replacing Dad (1999)
 The Lady in Question (1999)
 Rip Girls (2000)
 Blonde (2001)
 Hollywood Wives: The New Generation (2003)
 The Last Cowboy (2003)
 Molly: An American Girl on the Home Front (2006)

TV series:
 PBS American Playhouse Medal of Honor, Rag (1982)
 Everwood
 Crossing Jordan
 Law & Order: Criminal Intent
 Law & Order: Special Victims Unit

Publications
 Lady Director: Adventures in Hollywood, Television and Beyond, published by City Lights Books. 11/08/2022. .

References

External links 
 
 Gramercy Stories. Wayback Machine. Archived from the original on 2012-01-19.
 Official website for "For The Love of the Music", a documentary film about Club 47

1936 births
American film directors
American television directors
American women film directors
American women television directors
Living people
Place of birth missing (living people)
Brandeis University alumni
Publications